This article provides details of international football games played by the Indonesia women's national football team from 2000 to 2009.

Results

2001

2003

2005

2007

2008

2009

References

2000s in Indonesian sport
Indonesia women's national football team results